Henry Varnum Poor (December 8, 1812 – January 4, 1905) was an American financial analyst and founder of H.V. and H.W. Poor Co, which later evolved into the financial research and analysis bellwether, Standard & Poor's.

Biography
Born in East Andover, Massachusetts (now Andover, Maine) to Sylvanus and Mary (Merrill) Poor, he was the first of his family to attend college, graduating from Bowdoin in 1835. He was descended from General Enoch Poor of the Revolutionary War. He joined his uncle's law firm, being called to the bar in 1838. Later Henry and his brother John established a law practice in Bangor, Maine. By investing money in Maine's growing timber industry, the Poor brothers made a fortune. John Poor became a minor railway magnate in association with the European and North American Railway, and was heavily involved in the building of the Maine rail network.

In 1849, John purchased the American Railroad Journal, of which Henry became manager and editor. In 1860, Henry Poor published History of Railroads and Canals in the United States, an attempt to compile comprehensive information about the financial and operational state of U.S. railroad companies. He later established H.V. and H.W. Poor Co. with his son, Henry William, and published annual updated versions of his book. Standard & Poor's traces its history back to this publication.

In 1862 Henry Poor was appointed a government commissioner to the newly chartered Union Pacific Railroad, and left his position as editor of the Journal. That same year he was elected as the railroad company's first Secretary. He left the company shortly thereafter.

Poor was a resident of Tuxedo Park, New York, which was founded by his good friend Pierre Lorillard in 1886.  He also served as a co-founder of the American Geographical Society in 1851.

He died in Brookline, Massachusetts, at the age of 92.

Publications
 Henry Varnum Poor. History of Railroads and Canals in the United States (1860) (online)
 Henry Varnum Poor. Poor's Manual of Railroads (1868) (online)

References

External links
Papers, 1791-1921. Schlesinger Library, Radcliffe Institute, Harvard University.

1812 births
1905 deaths
People from Brookline, Massachusetts
Bowdoin College alumni
People from Bangor, Maine
People from Oxford County, Maine
American Geographical Society
19th-century American businesspeople